Otto Staiger (1894–1967) was a Swiss painter and glass artist.

References
This article was initially translated from the German Wikipedia.

20th-century Swiss painters
Swiss male painters
1894 births
1967 deaths
20th-century Swiss male artists